A list of films produced in France in 1972.

See also
1972 in France

Notes

References

External links
 French films of 1972 at the Internet Movie Database
French films of 1972 at Cinema-francais.fr

1972
Films
French